This is a list of endorsements for declared candidates in the Republican primaries for the 1920 United States presidential election.

Warren Harding

Leonard Wood

Frank Lowden

Hiram Johnson

William Sproul

Nicholas Butler

Miles Poindexter

Herbert Hoover

References

United States presidential election endorsements
1920 United States Republican presidential primaries